HD 28375 is a single star in the equatorial constellation of Taurus, near the southern constellation border with Eridanus. It was previously known by the Flamsteed designation 44 Eridani, although the name has fallen out of use because constellations were redrawn, placing the star out of Eridanus and into Taurus. The star is blue-white in hue and is dimly visible to the naked eye with an apparent visual magnitude of 5.53. The distance to this star is approximately 480 light-years based on parallax. It is drifting further away with a radial velocity of 18 km/s, after having come to within an estimated  some 3.7 million years ago.

Cowley (1972) and later Bragança et al. (2012) found a stellar classification of B3V for this object, matching a B-type main-sequence star. Houk and Swift assigned it a class of B5 III/IV, suggesting it is a more evolved star that is entering the giant stage. It has five times the mass of the Sun and is around three million years old, with a projected rotational velocity of just 13 km/s. The star is radiating 127 times the luminosity of the Sun from its photosphere at an effective temperature of about 13,000 K.

An infrared excess has been detected, indicating the presence of a circumstellar disk. The dust has a temperature of about 119 K and is orbiting  from the star.

References

B-type main-sequence stars
Circumstellar disks

Taurus (constellation)
Durchmusterung objects
Eridani, 44
028375
020884
1415